Carlos Deshawn Fischer, known professionally as Baby Money, is an American rapper from Detroit, who is currently signed to Quality Control Music. He is noted as a prominent figure of the Detroit hip hop scene.

Career
In 2021, he began to gain traction with the release of his single "Moncler Bubble". In January 2022, he signed to Quality Control Music. In February 2022, he released his project Easy Money with appearances from fellow Detroit rapper Babyface Ray, and rappers 42 Dugg, Icewear Vezzo, Tay B and Peezy. In September 2022, he released his project New Money with appearances from rappers Jeezy, Mozzy, Tay B and GT.

Musical style 
Writing for XXL, Robby Seabrook III describes Baby Money's style in the following manner: "Baby Money is a sharp, technical rapper with a good sense of humor who spits about making money and showing off as if it's second nature. His style feels reminiscent of Detroit rap's early days, but his always-updated flows bring him into the present."

References

External links 
 

African-American male rappers
21st-century American male musicians
Living people
People from Detroit
Rappers from Detroit
Quality Control artists
Year of birth missing (living people)